Chambers House, also known as "Stairways", is a historic home located near Newark, New Castle County, Delaware.  It was built between 1816 and 1852, and is a two- to three-story, Penn Plan bank house built of uncoursed fieldstone.  It has a one and two story frame addition at the east of the house dated to the late 19th century.

It was added to the National Register of Historic Places in 1988.

References

Houses on the National Register of Historic Places in Delaware
Houses completed in 1852
Houses in New Castle County, Delaware
National Register of Historic Places in New Castle County, Delaware
1852 establishments in Delaware